Professor Chang Hsin-kang, GBS, JP, FREng (born 9 July 1940, Shenyang, Liaoning, China), was the president of City University of Hong Kong. He received his bachelor's degree in civil engineering from National Taiwan University in 1962, his master's degree in structural engineering from Stanford University in 1964, and his PhD in biomedical engineering from Northwestern University in 1969.

Biography
Chang was Professor/Chairman of the Department of Biomedical Engineering at the University of Southern California (USC) from 1985 to 1990. He was a founding Dean of the School of Engineering at the Hong Kong University of Science and Technology in 1990, and the Dean of the School of Engineering of the University of Pittsburgh in 1994. He was appointed to be the President of the City University of Hong Kong in 1996; he retired in 2007.  He was appointed a Fellow of the Royal Academy of Engineering in 2000.

He is an internationally known biomedical engineering expert, having published more than 100 scientific articles, as well as being the editor of two research monographs. He holds a Canadian patent.  

On 27 June 2015 at the United International College's 7th Graduation Ceremony in Zhuhai, Chang Hsin-kang was rewarded with the Honorary Fellowships.

References

1940 births
Living people
Academic staff of the Hong Kong University of Science and Technology
Members of the National Committee of the Chinese People's Political Consultative Conference
Hong Kong scientists
National Taiwan University alumni
Robert R. McCormick School of Engineering and Applied Science alumni
Politicians from Shenyang
Stanford University alumni
Heads of universities in Hong Kong
Recipients of the Gold Bauhinia Star
Educators from Liaoning
People's Republic of China politicians from Liaoning
Scientists from Liaoning
Hong Kong politicians
Taiwanese people from Liaoning
Hong Kong expatriates in the United States
Academic staff of the City University of Hong Kong
University of Pittsburgh faculty